Brickellia nelsonii, or Nelson's brickellbush, is a Mexican species of flowering plants in the family Asteraceae. It is native to northeastern Mexico in the states of Tamaulipas, Coahuila, San Luis Potosí, and Nuevo León.

Brickellia nelsonii is an herb up to 100 cm (40 inches) tall, sometimes a bit woody near the base.

References

External links
Herbarium specimen collected in Nuevo León, identified as Brickellia lemmonii var. nelsonii

nelsonii
Flora of Northeastern Mexico
Plants described in 1917